Central Control Commission (or committee or collegium) may refer to:
Central Control Commission of the Communist Party of the Soviet Union
Central Control Commission of the Communist Party of China
Central Control Commission of the Socialist Unity Party of Germany
Central Control Commission of the Polish United Workers' Party
Central Collegium of the Romanian Communist Party
Central Control Commission of the Communist Party of Vietnam
Central Control Commission of the League of Communists of Yugoslavia
Central Control Commission of the League of Communists of Bosnia and Herzegovina
Central Control Commission of the League of Communists of Croatia
Central Control Commission of the League of Communists of Macedonia
Central Control Commission of the League of Communists of Montenegro
Central Control Commission of the League of Communists of Serbia
Central Control Commission of the League of Communists of Slovenia
Central Control Committee of the Hungarian Working People's Party
Central Control Committee of the Hungarian Socialist Workers' Party
Central Control Commission of the Workers' Party of Korea